John D. Floros is a Greek-American food scientist and academic administrator. He is the former president of New Mexico State University in Las Cruces, New Mexico.

Early life and education 
Floros was born and raised in Greece. After earning a Bachelor's and Master's of Science in food science and technology from the Agricultural University of Athens, Floros relocated to the United States to earn his Ph.D in food science and technology from the University of Georgia.

Career 
Floros began his career at Asteris Inc. and the Central Union of Agricultural Cooperatives before transitioning to a career in academics. Floros was a professor at Purdue University from 1988 to 2000. He then worked as a professor in and the head of the Pennsylvania State University Department of Food Science from 2000 to 2012. In 2007, Floros was selected as the 68th president of the Institute of Food Technologists, a non-profit scientific society based in Chicago.

In 2012, Floros joined the faculty of Kansas State University, working as the dean of the Kansas State University College of Agriculture and the university's director of research and extension. Floros became president of New Mexico State University on July 1, 2018.

In October 2021, following campus-wide demonstrations and a Faculty Senate vote of "no-confidence," along with allegations of "systemic failure of administrative leadership and dereliction of duty to uphold the land-grant mission, Hispanic-serving mission of the institution” there was a call for Floros' removal.  In the document submitted by staff, the allegations include Floros' and Provost Carol Parker's misappropriation of University funds, unethical hiring and promotion practices, deliberate circumvention of due process, rejection of principles and practices of shared governance, and broader impacts of systemic failure of leadership. In January 2022, Floros announced his resignation as President of New Mexico State University, leaving sole leadership of the university to Chancellor Dan Arvizu.

References 

Year of birth missing (living people)
Agricultural University of Athens alumni
American food scientists
Greek emigrants to the United States
Living people
Pennsylvania State University faculty
Presidents of New Mexico State University
Purdue University faculty
University of Georgia alumni